The Klassis Turkish Open was a golf tournament on the Challenge Tour, held in Turkey. First played in 1997 when Bradley Dredge triumphed over Magnus Persson Atlevi, it was discontinued after the 1998 edition. The Challenge Tour returned to Turkey in 2010 for the Turkish Challenge.

Winners

See also
Turkish Airlines Challenge
Turkish Airlines Open

References

External links
Coverage on the Challenge Tour's site

Former Challenge Tour events
Golf tournaments in Turkey
Recurring sporting events established in 1997
1998 disestablishments in Turkey